Ma Shanshan (born ) is a Chinese female track cyclist. She competed in the team pursuit event at the 2014 UCI Track Cycling World Championships.

References

Further reading
 Profile at cyclingarchives.com
 EuroSport
 British Cycling.org
 Track Cycling News.com

1986 births
Living people
Chinese track cyclists
Chinese female cyclists
Place of birth missing (living people)
21st-century Chinese women